The Yugoslav Cycling Federation or BSJ (in Serbo-Croatian: Biciklistički savez Jugoslavije) was the national governing body of cycle racing in Yugoslavia.

The BSJ was a member of the UCI.

History
Yugoslav Cycling Federation was founded in Zagreb as Jugoslovenski koturaški savez in 1920. After the World War II it was refounded in Belgrade in 1948. The BSJ organized Yugoslav National Road Race Championships, Yugoslav National Time Trial Championships, Tour of Croatia and Slovenia (from 1937) and Tour of Yugoslavia (from 1947). It was dissolved with the dissolution of SFR Yugoslavia.

National members of the European Cycling Union
Cycle racing organizations
Cycling
Cycle racing in Yugoslavia